Donal MacCarthy Reagh of Kilbrittain (died 1636) was an Irish magnate who owned the extensive lands of Carbery (almost half a million acres) in south-western County Cork.

Birth and origins 
Donal was born the son of Cormac MacCarthy Reagh and Eleanor Fitzgibbon. His father was the son and heir of Donal of the Pipes, 17th Prince of Carbery, but predeceased him. Donal, the subject of this article, therefore inherited the lands of Carbery from his grandfather. His father's family were the MacCarthy Reagh, a Gaelic Irish dynasty that branched from the MacCarthy-Mor line with Donal Maol MacCarthy Reagh, the first independent ruler of Carbery. This Donal was the 6th son of Donal Gott MacCarthy, a medieval King of Desmond. 

His mother was a daughter of Edmund Fitzgibbon, 11th White Knight, and widow of Florence MacCarthy of Iniskean. His mother's family, the Fitzgibbons, were Old English and descended from Maurice Fitzgibbon knighted in 1333 by Edward III.

MacCarthy seems to have been the only son and perhaps even the only child of his parents. At least Lainé names no brothers or sisters of his.

From prince to esquire 
MacCarthy's grandfather was the 17th Prince of Carbery. He lost this title in 1606 in a surrender and regrant to King James  I when the King confirmed the freehold of the lands but granted no title. The King probably expected a payment or at least the conversion to Protestantism. The MacCarthys of Muskerry, who were in a similar situation, obtained a viscountcy in 1628, probably for a payment. From the rank of a prince therefore MacCarthy's grandfather fell to that of a commoner. At the death of his grandfather there was no title to succeed. At that time MacCarthy was a minor. The inheritance was given to MacCarthy, who was called esquire of Kilbrittain.

Marriage and children 
MacCarthy married Ellen Roche, eldest daughter of David Roche, 7th Viscount Fermoy.

 
Donal and Ellen had at least one son:
Charles, succeeded as esquire of Kilbrittain and married Eleanor MacCarthy, born from his stepfather's 1st marriage.

After MacCarthy's death in or before 1599 Ellen remarried to Charles MacCarthy, 1st Viscount Muskerry, who thus became Charles's stepfather. This was also Muskerry's second marriage. From his first marriage Muskerry had a daughter Eleanor who became Charles's wife. Charles therefore married his stepfather's daughter from a previous marriage.

After Muskerry's death in 1641 Ellen married thirdly and last Thomas Fitzmaurice, 3rd son of Thomas Fitzmaurice, 18th Baron Kerry by his second wife Julia Power.

Death and timeline 
The dates of MacCarthy's death and of his widow's remarriage are disputed. Some propose 1599 or earlier,
 others 1636 or later. The earlier date is too near (26 years) to Ellen's father's birth in 1573.

MacCarthy was succeeded by his son Charles, who married Eleanor MacCarthy, daughter of his stepfather Charles MacCarthy, 1st Viscount of Muskerry from his first marriage.

Notes and references

Notes

Citations

Sources 

  – (for Ellen Roche)
  – West Carbery
  – Moels to Nuneham
 
  – L to M (for Muskerry)
  – (for timeline)
  – to 1603
 
 
 
 
  – Earls
 
 
  – Irish stem
 
 

1636 deaths
MacCarthy dynasty